Harry Isaacs (26 January 1908, in Johannesburg – 13 September 1961) was a South African boxer who competed in the 1928 Summer Olympics in Amsterdam.

In his first Olympic bout, he defeated Aage Fahrenholtz of Denmark in a points decision. In his second Olympic bout, he defeated Canadian boxer Vince Glionna on points. In his third Olympic bout, he lost to John Daley of the United States on a points decision in the semi-final round.

In his last Olympic bout, he took the bronze medal in the bantamweight class after defeating Frank Traynor of Ireland in a points decision.

He died on 13 September 1961 in Johannesburg.

1928 Olympic results
Below is the complete record of Harry Isaacs, a South African bantamweight boxer who competed at the 1928 Amsterdam Olympics:

 Round of 32: bye
 Round of 16: defeated Aage Fahrenholtz (Denmark) on points
 Quarterfinal: defeated Vince Glionna (Canada) on points
 Semifinal: lost to John Daley (United States) on points
 Bronze Medal Bout: defeated Frank Traynor (Ireland) on points (was awarded bronze medal)

References

External links
 Harry Isaacs' profile at databaseOlympics.com
 Harry Isaacs' profile at Sports Reference.com

1908 births
1961 deaths
Boxers from Johannesburg
Bantamweight boxers
Boxers at the 1928 Summer Olympics
Olympic boxers of South Africa
Olympic bronze medalists for South Africa
Jewish South African sportspeople
Jewish boxers
Olympic medalists in boxing
Medalists at the 1928 Summer Olympics
South African male boxers